Nightbook is an album created by Italian composer Ludovico Einaudi and released in 2009. The album saw Einaudi take a new direction with his music as he incorporated synthesized sounds alongside his solo piano playing. A new approach could be seen with tracks such as "Nightbook", and "Lady Labyrinth" where the element of percussion was utilized along the piano, acting as a driving force throughout the song. 
In Italy the album went Gold with more than 35,000 copies sold. Einaudi describes this album as "A night-time landscape. A garden faintly visible under the dull glow of the night sky. A few stars dotting the darkness above, shadows of the trees all around. Light shining from a window behind me. What I can see is familiar, but it seems alien at the same time. It's like a dream - anything may happen."

The title track "Nightbook" was used in the TV advertisement for the Channel 4 drama "Any Human Heart".
The track "Lady Labyrinth" is often used as background music in Top Gear specials.

Track listing

Charts

Certifications and sales

References

2009 classical albums
Ludovico Einaudi albums